Talitha is an Aramaic word quoted in the Christian Bible, which became a given name. It may refer to:


Name
 Talitha (given name), article on the origin of the personal name

People

 Talitha Bateman (born 2001), American actress
 Talitha Cummins, Australian journalist
 Talitha Espiritu, Filipino author and academic
 Talitha Getty (1940-1971), style icon of the late 1960s
 Talitha Irakau (born 1995), Papua New Guinean footballer
 Talitha MacKenzie, US singer and ethnomusicologist
 Talitha Stevenson (born 1977), English novelist and journalist
 Talitha Washington (born 1974), American mathematician

Stars
 Talitha Australis or Southern Talitha is Kappa Ursae Majoris
 Talitha Borealis or Northern Talitha is Iota Ursae Majoris

Other uses
 Talitha, a gelechoid moth genus in subfamily Depressariinae, invalidly named by Clarke in 1978 and later renamed Hozbeka
 Talitha, a thrips genus in subfamily Phlaeothripinae, named by Faure in 1958
 Talitha, formerly Talitha G, a yacht owned by the Getty family
 Talitha Kum, international network of Catholic nuns against human trafficking